The Holy Bull Stakes is a Grade III American Thoroughbred horse race for three year old horses run over the distance of one and one-sixteenth miles on the dirt, held annually in January at Gulfstream Park, Hallandale Beach, Florida.  The event currently carries a purse of $250,000.

History

The event was inaugurated on 7 April 1990 as the Preview Stakes over a distance of  miles, and it was created as a replacement for the Flamingo Stakes that ceased to exist following the closure of Hialeah Park Race Track. The event was held three weeks after the Florida Derby and the winner Home At Last did not run in any of the Triple Crown Races.

In 1991 the distance was decreased to  miles and in 1992 the event was rescheduled to early February thus becoming a preparatory race for the Florida Derby.

In 1995 the Preview Stakes was upgraded to a Grade III. That same year Gulfstream Park scheduled an event in March in honor of U.S. Racing Hall of Fame horse Holy Bull who had won the Florida Derby in 1994. 

The following year in 1996, Gulfstream Park replaced the Preview Stakes with the Holy Bull Stakes which assumed the classification of the event.

In 2008 the event was scheduled in April after the Florida Derby and run over a distance of  miles.
 
The event was upgraded to Grade II in 2014 and held this status until 2019. The event was degraded to Grade III for 2020.

The event has produced Classic winners. The 1994 winner Go for Gin won the Kentucky Derby. In 2006 Barbaro won the event for his fourth straight win continuing on to win the Florida Derby and the Kentucky Derby. In 2020 Tiz the Law also won the Florida Derby continuing on to win the Belmont Stakes when it was held in late June and was the first event in the Triple Crown series which was rescheduled to due to COVID-19 pandemic.

The event is part of the Road to the Kentucky Derby with qualification points given to the first four placegetters.

Records
Speed record: 
  miles – 1:41.62   Go for Gin  (1994)   
 1 mile – 1:35.19   Dialed In  (2011) 
  miles – 1:49.31  Barbaro  (2006)

Margins:
 8 lengths – Suave Prospect  (1995)

Most wins by a trainer:
 3 – Nick Zito (1994, 1995, 2011)
 3 – Kiaran McLaughlin (2005, 2014, 2016)

Most wins by a jockey:
 5 – Jerry D. Bailey (1990, 1993, 1994, 1995, 1998)

Most wins by an owner:
 2 –  William J. Condren  (1994, 1995)
 2 –  Paul Braverman  (2014, 2019)

Winners

See also
List of American and Canadian Graded races

External links
 2020–21 Gulfstream Park Media Guide

References

1990 establishments in Florida
Horse races in Florida
Gulfstream Park
Triple Crown Prep Races
Graded stakes races in the United States
Recurring sporting events established in 1990
Grade 3 stakes races in the United States
Flat horse races for three-year-olds